

Offseason 
 October 14, 1954: Owen Friend was purchased from the Indians by the Boston Red Sox.
 November 16, 1954: Ralph Kiner was acquired by the Indians from the Chicago Cubs for $60,000 as part of an earlier deal (the Cubs sent a player to be named later to the Indians for Sam Jones and players to be named later) made on September 30, 1954. The Indians sent Gale Wade to the Cubs on November 30 to complete the trade.
 Prior to 1955 season: Joe Ginsberg was sent by the Indians to the San Diego Padres.

Regular season

Season standings

Record vs. opponents

Notable transactions 
 May 16, 1955: Hal Newhouser was released by the Indians.
 June 15, 1955: Dave Pope and Wally Westlake were traded by the Indians to the Baltimore Orioles for Billy Cox and Gene Woodling. Billy Cox refused to report to his new team. The Orioles sent $15,000 to the Indians on June 15 as compensation.
 July 2, 1955: Dave Philley was selected off waivers from the Indians by the Baltimore Orioles.

Roster

Player stats

Batting

Starters by position 
Note: Pos = Position; G = Games played; AB = At bats; H = Hits; Avg. = Batting average; HR = Home runs; RBI = Runs batted in

Other batters 
Note: G = Games played; AB = At bats; H = Hits; Avg. = Batting average; HR = Home runs; RBI = Runs batted in

Pitching

Starting pitchers 
Note: G = Games pitched; IP = Innings pitched; W = Wins; L = Losses; ERA = Earned run average; SO = Strikeouts

Other pitchers 
Note: G = Games pitched; IP = Innings pitched; W = Wins; L = Losses; ERA = Earned run average; SO = Strikeouts

Relief pitchers 
Note: G = Games pitched; W = Wins; L = Losses; SV = Saves; ERA = Earned run average; SO = Strikeouts

Awards and honors 

All-Star Game
Bobby Ávila, Second base, Reserve
Larry Doby, Outfield, Reserve
Al López, Manager
Al Rosen, Third base, Reserve
Herb Score, Pitcher, Reserve
Al Smith, Outfield, Reserve
Early Wynn, Pitcher, Reserve

Farm system 

LEAGUE CHAMPIONS: Keokuk, Spartanburg

Notes

References 
1955 Cleveland Indians team at Baseball-Reference
1955 Cleveland Indians team at baseball-almanac.com
1955 WS at Baseball-Reference

Cleveland Indians seasons
Cleveland Indians season
Cleveland Indians